Trichotichnus philippinus is a species of beetle in the family Carabidae. It was formerly a member of the genus Bottchrus.

References

Harpalinae